Willington is a civil parish in Cheshire West and Chester, England. It contains nine buildings that are recorded in the National Heritage List for England as designated listed buildings.  Of these, one is listed at Grade II*, the middle grade, and the others are at Grade II.  The parish is entirely rural, and contains two listed country houses, Tirley Garth and Willington Hall, both of which are listed.  The other listed structures are associated with these houses, plus a farmhouse.

Key

Buildings

References

Citations

Sources

Listed buildings in Cheshire West and Chester
Lists of listed buildings in Cheshire